Nasimabad may refer to:

Nasimabad, Isfahan
Nasimabad-e Bala, Isfahan Province
Nasimabad, Qazvin
Nasimabad, Razavi Khorasan